Saint Peter is a Roman Catholic church in Céret, southern France. Mentioned for the first time in 814, the present day church was built and rebuilt several times from the 11th to the 18th centuries. It was declared a national monument in 1998.

Gallery

External links

Bibliography

References

Buildings and structures completed in the 18th century
Peter, Ceret
Monuments historiques of Pyrénées-Orientales
18th-century churches in France